Tangani'a is a collectivity located in the Fizi Territory of Sud-Kivu Province, Democratic Republic of the Congo. In the Bembe language (Kibembe) Tangani'a means Tanganyika, which is the name of the major lake next to the collectivity.

The main town of the Tangani'a collectivity is Mbo' ko located alongside Lake Tanganyika. In this part of Fizi Territory the largest group of the Bembe people are the Banyan'gangya tribe, who are also found in the collectivity of N'gangya, the largest of the 5 collectivities of the Fizi Territory.

The main economic activity in Tangani'a is fishing, agriculture and farming. The place is very behind in terms of development due to the isolation of the Fizi Territory since the independence of the Congo. The type of public servants you may find there are primary and secondary teachers, some prosecutors, tax collectors, local government agents and spies. More than 90% of the population are unemployed. The Congolese government cannot do much in the territory due to ongoing instability in the eastern part of the DRC.

References 

Lake Tanganyika
Populated places in South Kivu